Deleta Parmley Williams (born August 21, 1935) is a former American Democrat politician from Warrensburg, Missouri, who served in the Missouri House of Representatives.

Born in Caraway, Arkansas, she graduated from Central Missouri State University with a bachelor's degree in business administration.  She has worked as a real estate broker and as Johnson County collector.

References

1935 births
Living people
20th-century American politicians
21st-century American politicians
20th-century American women politicians
21st-century American women politicians
Democratic Party members of the Missouri House of Representatives
Women state legislators in Missouri
People from Warrensburg, Missouri